Minter Village is an unincorporated community in Kern County, California.

During World War II, the place was the site of an Army Air Corps airfield Minter Field. Minter Village was founded following the war. The Minter Field post office operated from 1942 to 1949. The Minter Village post office operated from 1948 to 1961.

References

Unincorporated communities in Kern County, California
Unincorporated communities in California